Ramesh Vishwanath Katti (born 21 October 1964) is an Indian politician. He was a member of the Indian Parliament from 2009 to 2014, representing Chikkodi (Lok Sabha constituency).
He is rendering services to other Cooperative Institutions including:
 President, The Belgaum District Central Coop. Bank Ltd., Belgaum
 Ex-Chairman, Shri Hiranyakeshi Sahakari Sakkare Karkhane Niyamit
 Sankeshwar (Dist. Belgaum)
 Vice President, National Heavy Engineering Coop. Ltd., Pune
 President, Mahanteshwar Vidya Sansthe
 Bellad Bagewad, Ex-Chairman and Director : The Bellad Bagewadi Urban Souhard Sahakari Bank Niyamit, B. Bagewadi
 Founder : Rahul Katti Sports & Social Club, B.Bagewadi
 Director : Karnataka State Federation of Cooperative Sugar Factories Ltd., Bangalore, Director :
 Krishi Seva Sahakari Bank Ltd., Bellad-Bagewadi, Director :
 Karnataka Ranga Bhoomi Abhivruddhi & Uttejan Sahakari Sangh, Belgaum
 Director : Chamber of Commerce and Industries, Belgaum
 Member Murusavir Vidhyavardhak Sangh Residential School, Shirdhan
 Ex-Director: National Federation of Coop. Sugar Factories Ltd., Delhi
Ramesh Katti received many awards and honours including "Bharatiya Udyog Ratna Award -96″, "Rashtriya Udyog Ratna Award","National Industrial Excellence Award", "Udyog Vikas Ratna Award", " S. V. Parthasarathy Award " with " Gold Medal " in appreciation of the better adoption of Water Recycling Unit and " Shrestha Sahakari" Award – 2007.

Due to Centenary in Co-operative movement in Karnataka, received the "Shrestha Sahakari "award as young co-operative leader & honoured at Mysore by Hon’ble Chief Minister of Karnataka.

He visited South Africa, Switzerland, Mauritius, Italy, France, Sri Lanka, U.A.E. and other countries for higher study in co-operative sector.

References

1964 births
Living people
India MPs 2009–2014
Lok Sabha members from Karnataka
National Democratic Alliance candidates in the 2014 Indian general election
Bharatiya Janata Party politicians from Karnataka